The 1996 Country Music Association Awards, 30th Ceremony, was held on October 2, 1996 at the Grand Ole Opry House, Nashville, Tennessee, and was hosted by CMA Award Winner, Vince Gill.

Winners and Nominees 
Winner are in Bold.

Hall of Fame

References 

Country Music Association
CMA
Country Music Association Awards
Country Music Association Awards
Country Music Association Awards
Country Music Association Awards
20th century in Nashville, Tennessee
Events in Nashville, Tennessee